Harpovoluta charcoti is a species of sea snail, a marine gastropod mollusk in the family Volutidae, the volutes.

Description
The size of the shell varies between 25 mm and 75 mm.

Distribution
Harpovoluta charcoti is widely found in and around Antarctica/sub-Antarctic or Southern Ocean.

References

 Lamy, E. 1910. Mission dans l'Antarctique dirigé par M. le Dr. Charcot (1908–1910): Collections recueillies par M. le Dr. Jacques Liouville: Gastropodes prosobranches et scaphopodes. Bulletin Muséum d'Histoire Naturelle. Paris 16: 318–324
 Thiele, Johannes. "Die antarktischen schnecken und muscheln." Deutsche Südpolar-Expedition (1901–1903) 13 (1912): 183–286
 Dell, R.K. 1990. Antarctic Mollusca: with special reference to the fauna of the Ross Sea. Bulletin of the Royal Society of New Zealand 27: 1–311
 Engl W. (2012) Shells of Antarctica. Hackenheim: Conchbooks. 402 pp.

External links
 
  Harpovoluta charcoti (Lamy, 1910). Accessed through: De Broyer, C.; Clarke, A.; Koubbi, P.; Pakhomov, E.; Scott, F.; Vanden Berghe, E. and Danis, B. (Eds.) (2012) The SCAR-MarBIN Register of Antarctic Marine Species (RAMS).
 MNHN, Paris: syntype

Volutidae
Gastropods described in 1910